6-EAPB (1-(benzofuran-6-yl)-N-ethylpropan-2-amine) is a potentially psychedelic and potentially entactogenic drug of the benzofuran class; it is structurally related to 6-APB and MDMA.

Legality
As an N-ethyl derivative of 6-APB, 6-EAPB fell outside the scope of the Temporary Class Drug ban issued by the Home Office on June 10, 2013.
The ACMD has advised that 6-EAPB (and other benzofurans) are moved to Class B, this came into action on 10 June 2014.

References

Substituted amphetamines
6-Benzofuranethanamines
Designer drugs
Serotonin-norepinephrine-dopamine releasing agents
Serotonin receptor agonists
Entactogens and empathogens